John Jeffrey (born 25 March 1959 in Kelso in the Scottish Borders) is a former Scotland international rugby union player. He is an administrator for World Rugby.

Rugby Union career

Amateur career

Jeffrey was educated at St. Mary's School, Melrose and Merchiston Castle School.

His nicknames were "The Great White Shark" and "JJ", the former widely thought to be because of his blonde hair, though in a 1990 book called 'The Grudge' by Tom English, it is a nickname that was given to him because of his very white skin.

He played for Kelso.

Provincial career

He played for South of Scotland.

International career

He was capped by Scotland 'B' 3 times between 1983 and 1984.

He won forty caps for Scotland between 1984 and 1991, making him, at the time, Scotland's most capped flanker. Often known to be first to the breakdown point, first with the tackle, or first with an inspired counter, Jeffrey had the ability to score important tries, of which he scored 11, another Scottish record at the time, shared with back-row colleague Derek White.

Journalist, Richard Bath, described him as "one of the most galvanising sights in Five Nations rugby throughout the 1980s and early 1990s." He was an outstanding performer in the Grand Slam season of 1990.

In 1988, after playing football with the Calcutta Cup along Princes Street in Edinburgh with England's Dean Richards, Jeffrey received a six-month ban from the Scottish Rugby Union. Richards received a one match sentence from the English Rugby Football Union. The trophy was severely dented, and cost hundreds of pounds to repair. Jeffrey later admitted to having been drunk at the time of the incident: "There was no doubt it was us. It was a mix of alcohol and high jinks. I think I had sobered up a bit by the time I got back to the hotel. I remember looking at the cup and thinking, 'hmmm, we could be in a spot of bother here'."

Jeffrey had been a British and Irish Lion on the 1989 Tour of Australia, ironically being kept out of the Test side by his national team-mates Finlay Calder and Derek White, and Englishmen Mike Teague who would be on the losing side against Jeffrey in the Calcutta Cup match the following year.

During the 1990 Hong Kong Sevens, Jeffrey played for Scotland 7s, but when they were knocked out, he went on to play for Wales 7s as they were suffering from too many injuries.

Coaching career

He has been involved in coaching the Scotland youth teams.

Administrative career

He has been a member of the International Rugby Board (Now called World Rugby) Council and head of referees since 2010. In December 2020 Jeffrey was appointed as Chairman of the Scottish Rugby Board.  In December 2022 Scottish Rugby announced that Jeffrey would stand down as Chairman in May 2023 but would remain on the board.

Farming career

Jeffrey's "day job" was his Borders farm, of which he had only one regret: "If I stand on a hill I can see England."

Broadcasting career

He commentates at rugby games on BBC Radio Scotland's Sportsound programme.

References

Sources

 Bath, Richard (ed.) The Complete Book of Rugby (Seven Oaks Ltd, 1997 )

External links

John Jeffrey on Sporting Heroes
A tribute to John Jeffrey in The Scotsman newspaper

1959 births
Living people
British & Irish Lions rugby union players from Scotland
Kelso RFC players
Male rugby sevens players
People educated at Merchiston Castle School
People educated at St. Mary's School, Melrose
Rugby union flankers
Rugby union players from Kelso
Scotland 'B' international rugby union players
Scotland international rugby sevens players
Scotland international rugby union players
Scottish rugby union coaches
Scottish rugby union commentators
Scottish rugby union players
South of Scotland District (rugby union) players